Stage Struck is a 1917 silent film drama directed by Edward Morrissey and starring Dorothy Gish. It was produced by Fine Arts Films and distributed through Triangle Film Corporation.

A copy survives in the Library of Congress collection and Cinemateca Brasileira, Sao Paulo Brazil .

Plot summary

Cast
 Dorothy Gish - Ruth Colby
 Frank Bennett - Jack Martin
 Kate Toncray - Mrs Martin
 Jennie Lee - Mrs Teedles
 Spottiswoode Aitken - The Judge
 Fred Warren - Jack Schneider
 Marzie Radford - The Slavey

uncredited
 Carmel Myers - Bit
 Madame Sul-Te-Wan -

References

External links
 Stage Struck at IMDb.com
 
 

1917 films
American silent feature films
Triangle Film Corporation films
American black-and-white films
Silent American drama films
1917 drama films
1910s American films
1910s English-language films